Damit Katha Adam Thirigindi is a 1987 ( Damit Story has been Reversed) Telugu-language comedy film, produced by Jyothi Kumar under the Sri Kanaka Mahalakshmi Creations banner, presented by Rajendra Prasad and directed by K. Vasu. It stars Rajendra Prasad, Chandra Mohan, Naresh, Jeevitha Rajashekar  (in her major Telugu debut) and music composed by Sivaji Raja.

Cast
Rajendra Prasad as Gagapathi & Chakravarthy (Dual role)
Chandra Mohan as Chandram, Chalapathi & Parvathisam (Triple Role)
Naresh as Raja
Jeevitha Rajashekar as Rani
Prabha as Lalithamba
Sudha as Vasanthi
Suthi Veerabhadra Rao as Parvathisam's father-in-law
KK Sarma as Constable Simhachalam

Soundtrack

Music composed by Sivaji Raja. The music was released on AVM Audio Company.

References

1987 films
1980s Telugu-language films